Fulgore is a player character in the Killer Instinct series of fighting games by Rare. Fulgore was introduced in the original Killer Instinct in 1994 as an advanced fighting cyborg and a nemesis of the protagonist Jago. The character was met with positive critical reception and became an icon of the series.

Appearances
In the first Killer Instinct, Fulgore is a cyborg and the penultimate opponent in single-player mode. Developed by Ultratech, the masterminds behind the titular Killer Instinct tournament, Fulgore is the first in a planned series of state-of-the-art cyber soldiers. While designed to resemble a knight to help gain the people's trust, rumors say the human parts used in its construction originated from an organ harvesting operation based in Moscow. Before the Fulgore Mk.I model is even finished, the team of scientists developing it have already begun work on an upgraded model. As a final test of its power, the Fulgore prototype is entered into the Killer Instinct tournament; if successful, Fulgore would be placed into mass production.
In the sequel, Killer Instinct 2, a new, enhanced Fulgore model is created after the first Fulgore was destroyed by Jago in the first tournament. His goal is to kill Jago, whom he considers his mortal rival. In the end, he is defeated by Jago and his sister Orchid.

A third Fulgore model appears in the rebooted Killer Instinct for Xbox One to help defend Ultratech against its enemies, acting as the final opponent of Season One's arcade mode. However, it begins to develop self-awareness and defy its programming due to the residual memories of Eagle, Thunder's missing younger brother, whose mind was used as a blueprint for Fulgore's neural network. A prototype combat android that directly preceded the Fulgore line, nicknamed "Kilgore", was also introduced, sharing several attacks with Fulgore.

Outside of the games, Fulgore appeared in the 1996 Killer Instinct comic series, marking the first time the connection between Eagle and Fulgore was explored in any Killer Instinct media. Fulgore also appears in the 2017 comics series as one of several generic drones utilized by Ultratech. Fulgore was also one of six Killer Instinct characters to make a cameo appearance in the video game Viva Piñata: Trouble in Paradise as a Piñata Vision Card. Additionally, a weapon named "Fulgore's Fist" can be unlocked by players in Banjo-Kazooie: Nuts & Bolts.

Gameplay
In the first two games, Fulgore's primary weapons are his arm-mounted plasma blades. Fulgore can perform a variety of moves with these weapons: he can simply perform a standard slash, a more powerful plasma slash, as well as launch up to three projectiles at a time. Fulgore's eyes function as weapons, and can launch an array of lasers and plasma from them. Fulgore's head can convert into a machine gun to finish enemies, or a giant plasma cannon to melt enemies, although these two weapons cannot be utilized in direct combat and must instead be used to finish opponents. Fulgore possesses the ability to teleport behind an opponent, in which he turns black and reappears. Fulgore also uses a technique called "Robot Eye" in which a small amount of plasma is emitted from his eye and that can only be executed at close range. The last of Fulgore's techniques is his ability to deflect projectiles, in which Fulgore coats his body with a blue shield. In Killer Instinct 2 he also gains an additional, Predator-like ability to turn invisible. Fulgore uses his blades in conjunction with a barrage of kicks (especially roundhouse kicks) and can also perform a large uppercut similar to Jago's. "Robot Eye" can be used as part of a combo, and the launched projectiles to finish a combo.

The new version of Fulgore (previously seen only in an artbook and leaked in character roster) was added as a playable character to KI 2013 in an April 2014 update. According to Chris Carter of Destructoid, Fulgore "is a massive powerhouse. His signature blade dash is back (now a down-forward kick command instead of a charge move), as is his eye laser, projectile, shoryuken (plasma slice), and teleport. He's a lot like Jago in the sense that he's a 'Shotokan' scheme that's very easy to pick up, but difficult to master -- especially in this robot's case. ... Where Fulgore utterly differs from the rest of the cast is his unique Devastation Beam move, which requires a maximum shadow meter and an active Instinct Mode to pull off". According to Prima Games' guide to KI 2013, "like Spinal and Glacius before him, Fulgore is one of the harder characters to use, with special tools that may not be easy to grasp for newcomers". They ultimately called him "a better version of Spinal".

Reception

According to Game Informer, "as the star of Killer Instincts Super Nintendo and Nintendo 64 box art, Fulgore has always been the poster child for the Killer Instinct franchise." In Game Informers 2009 list of "Top Ten Best Fighting Game Characters", he placed ninth. ScrewAttack's Death Battle opined Fulgore outclassed Mortal Kombat'''s cyborg Sektor in most aspects in which the two characters were compared to each other.

His machine gun finishing move was ranked as 36th on a list of "craziest fatalities" in gaming by Complex'' in 2011, who also ranked him the 12th "coolest" robot in gaming the next year. The same finishing move was included of 13 greatest decapitations in video games by GamesRadar, who also listed it among the "kick-ass powers that game characters forgot they had" for how he never uses it during combat itself.

See also
List of fictional cyborgs

References

Cyborg characters in video games
Fictional Native American people in video games
Fictional knife-fighters
Fictional shotokan practitioners
Killer Instinct characters
Male characters in video games
Male video game villains
Microsoft antagonists
Video game characters introduced in 1994
Video game characters who can turn invisible
Robot characters in video games